(born 1964) is a Japanese writer.  He is best known for scripting the television series Iron Chef and the 2009 Academy Award for Best Foreign Language Film recipient Departures.  Koyama has also worked under the pen name Udon Kumayakko, an anagram of his real name read backwards in Japanese.

Biography
Koyama was born in 1964 in Hondo (now part of Amakusa), Kumamoto, Japan. His father, Kiyotsugu, worked in finance, while his mother, Takako, owned a beauty parlor. He has a brother named Shōdō (将堂) three years younger than him who has Down syndrome; Koyama says their parents strove to raise them equally. As a child Koyama considered becoming a poet, but did not follow through.

As a broadcasting student at the Nihon University College of Art, he began working under Yasuji Hayashi of Nippon Cultural Broadcasting. Hayashi, who found him an "interesting character", asked Koyama to begin writing scripts for broadcast. In Koyama's third year he branched out into television screenwriting, making his debut with the late-night show 11pm. Continuing this screenwriting after graduation, Koyama began getting attention for his work on Fuji Television's Kanossa no Kutsujoku (1990–1991), a late-night show which "took various modern-day social phenomena and products and explained them satirically by presenting them as historical events and folklore".

Koyama later wrote Nippon Television's Susume Denpa Shonen, and Fuji's Iron Chef. In 2003 he wrote an International Emmy Award-nominated series, The Perfect Manual.

In 2008 Shochiku hired Koyama to adapt 's autobiographical ; this was Koyama's first venture in the feature film industry. Koyama dropped many of the book's religious themes, changing them with more humanistic ones, and integrated a subplot from a novel he was writing. The final film, Departures, was submitted to the 81st Academy Awards for the Best Foreign Language Film and won, the first Japanese win in the category. For his writing, Koyama received numerous accolades, including a Kinema Junpo Award, Yomiuri Prize, and Japan Academy Prize. By December 2009 the film had won 98 awards.

Koyama began heading the Project Design department of the Tohoku University of Art and Design when that program was established in 2009. The program teaches students how to plan productions. Later that year he was one of the writers of Hutch the Honeybee, a film adaptation of the anime The Adventures of Hutch the Honeybee (1970–71). He also wrote the 2009 live action film Snow Prince. In 2012 Koyama was named representative director and president of the restaurant Shimogamo Saryo in Kyoto Prefecture.  In 2013 Koyama was company director of Amakusa Airlines, based out of his hometown. When tasked with promoting Kumamoto Prefecture, he had art director Manabu Mizuno design the bear-shaped mascot Kumamon; it generated $1.2 billion in income for the prefecture in two years.

Koyama's writing includes various articles for newspapers and magazines. He has released several novels, including Film (フィルム) and Awaiting (まってる). He is the representative of N35 Inc., a literary agency specializing in broadcast screenplay writers, and he is president and CEO of the marketing firm Orange and Partners.

References

Works cited

External links

1964 births
Living people
People from Kumamoto Prefecture
21st-century Japanese novelists
Japanese songwriters
Japanese screenwriters
Nihon University alumni
Yomiuri Prize winners
21st-century screenwriters
21st-century pseudonymous writers